Heidi El Tabakh (born September 25, 1986) is an Egyptian-born Canadian former professional tennis player.

Her highest singles ranking by the WTA is 146, which she reached in October 2012. Her career-high of 173 in doubles, she set in February 2010. She represented Egypt, the country of her birth, from 2002 to April 2005, but since then has represented Canada.

She has been inactive since April 2016 and became Canada's Fed Cup captain in 2019.

Tennis career

2002–2016
El Tabakh won one of the biggest singles tournaments of her career in 2009 at the $25k in Valladolid, Spain. In May 2010, she qualified for her Grand Slam debut at the French Open, where she lost to Aravane Rezaï in the first round. 

In April 2012, El Tabakh won the second $25k event of her career at the Challenger in Jackson. She defeated former world No. 14, Elena Bovina, in the final. The week after, she won her second straight and third $25k tournament of her career in Pelham. In May 2012, El Tabakh qualified again for the French Open, but lost to fellow Canadian Aleksandra Wozniak in the first round. 

In May 2014, she won the fourth $25k title of her career when she defeated Maria Sanchez in Raleigh. In August 2015 at the Rogers Cup, she reached the second round in doubles with fellow Canadian Françoise Abanda. In September 2015 in Redding, El Tabakh captured the seventh singles title of her career, her fifth $25k, by defeating Shérazad Reix in the final.

She played her last match on the professional tennis circuit in April 2016, at the $50k Charlottesville Classic where she had to retire in the first round against Sachia Vickery.

ITF Circuit finals

Singles: 9 (7 titles, 2 runner-ups)

Doubles: 19 (10 titles, 9 runner-ups)

Grand Slam performance timeline

Singles

Head-to-head record
El Tabakh's win–loss record (7–14, 33%) against players who were ranked world No. 100 or higher when played is as follows: Players who have been ranked world No. 1 are in boldface.

  Anastasia Pavlyuchenkova 1–0
  Karolina Šprem 1–0
  Tathiana Garbin 1–0
  Edina Gallovits-Hall 1–0
  Stéphanie Foretz 1–0
  Patricia Mayr-Achleitner 1–0
  Sania Mirza 1–1
  Ana Ivanovic 0–1
  Samantha Stosur 0–1
  Yanina Wickmayer 0–1
  Zheng Jie 0–1
  Aravane Rezaï 0–1
  Alisa Kleybanova 0–1
  Aleksandra Wozniak 0–1
  Lauren Davis 0–1
  Anca Barna 0–1
  Anastasiya Yakimova 0–1
  Jana Čepelová 0–1
  Tímea Babos 0–1
  Stéphanie Cohen-Aloro 0–1

* statistics as of March 2016

Notes

References

External links

 
 
 

1986 births
Living people
Canadian female tennis players
Canadian people of Egyptian descent
Egyptian female tennis players
Sportspeople from Alexandria
Tennis players from Toronto